Melvin Ernest Thompson (May 1, 1903 – October 3, 1980) was an American educator and politician from Millen in the U.S. state of Georgia. Generally known as M.E. Thompson during his political career, he served as the 70th Governor of Georgia from 1947 to 1948 and was elected as the first Lieutenant Governor of Georgia in 1946.

Early life and education
Thompson was born in Millen, Georgia, to Henry Jackson Thompson and his wife Eva Edenfield Thompson. He was the youngest of seven children and his father died just after his first birthday. His father was a sharecropper. Thompson grew up in poverty, but through hard work and determination, he was able to leave the farm to pursue a higher education. He helped pay his way through college by working various jobs, including student teaching and the selling of bibles door to door. He graduated from Emory University in 1926, then earned a Master of Arts (M.A.) from the University of Georgia in 1935. He also earned all of the credits for a Ph.D. from the University of Georgia, but because his adviser died, he never defended his dissertation. Following his college career, Thompson worked in education, first as a teacher and coach, a principal, a district superintendent, moving all the way up to assistant school superintendent for the state. Thompson was a supporter of Governor Ellis Arnall and was hired as his Executive Secretary. Arnall then appointed him to the position of State Revenue Commissioner in 1945.

Family
Melvin Ernest Thompson married Dora Anne Newton, from Millen, Ga, in 1926, and had one child, Melvin E. Thompson Jr., Melvin E. Thompson Jr. married Mary Bathsheba Carter and they had four children, Marianne Thea, Tarkenton Newton, Carter Maria and Melvin E. the 3rd. Melvin Jr. had a fifth child with his second wife Laura Mitchell, Charles Thompson.

Lieutenant Governor of Georgia

In 1946, Thompson ran for the newly created position of Lieutenant Governor of Georgia. He won the election and became Georgia's first Lieutenant Governor. Following Thompson's election, Governor-electct Eugene Talmadge died in Decembeofr 19, 6 and the GeorgiS statCoconstitution was vague on who would be sworn in as governor, causing the three governors controversy. Thompson felt that as the lieutenant governor-elect, he should become the governor. But the state legislature was controlled by Talmadge supporters. They invoked a clause in the Georgia state constitution which allowed for the legislature to pick between the second- and third-place candidates. The people who finished second and third were two write-in candidates, James V. Carmichael and Eugene's son, Herman E. Talmadge. The legislature selected Herman Talmadge to become the governor. He would hold that position temporarily.

Governor of Georgia

Thompson and Arnall both claimed the office of governor. Arnall later renounced his claim to support Thompson. The Supreme Court of Georgia ruled that Thompson was the legitimate governor and that the legislature had violated the state constitution by selecting Talmadge. Thompson's numerous achievements as the 70th Governor of Georgia include much needed improvements to highway infrastructure, public education, and the purchase of Jekyll Island, a beach retreat for the average Georgian. He was able to raise the salary of teachers, provide free books to students, and extend high school to the 12th grade. His purchase of Jekyll Island for $675,000.00 is still considered to be one of the greatest real estate purchases made in U.S. history. Thompson was able to achieve many things during his shortened term, with very limited cooperation from the state legislature, and without raising taxes on the citizens of Georgia.

Later political activities
Thompson unsuccessfully opposed Talmadge three additional times, twice in gubernatorial elections in 1950 and 1954 and finally in 1956 for one of Georgia's United States Senate seats. In the mid-1950s, Thompson moved to Valdosta, Georgia, where he transitioned into a successful career as a real estate developer. Thompson died at the age of 77 on October 3, 1980, in Valdosta. His family turned down an offer for him to lie in state, in the rotunda of the State Capitol. He is interred in a mausoleum at the McLane Riverview Memorial Gardens, in that same city.

Highway dedication 
In 2013 the Georgia Legislature by House Resolution 47 By: Representatives Shaw of the 176th, Carter of the 175th, Black of the 174th, Sharper of the  177th, and Houston of the 170th named a portion of Interstate 75 in Lowndes County from the West Hill Avenue exit to the North Valdosta Road exit is dedicated as the Governor Melvin Ernest Thompson Memorial Highway.[House Resolution 47  By: Representatives Shaw of the 176th, Carter of the 175th, Black of the 174th, Sharper of the  177th, and Houston of the 170th].

References

External links
 
 M.E. Thompson and the Purchase of Jekyll Island historical marker
Stuart A. Rose Manuscript, Archives, and Rare Book Library, Emory University: M.E. Thompson papers, 1946-1954

1903 births
1980 deaths
Democratic Party governors of Georgia (U.S. state)
Emory University alumni
University of Georgia alumni
Lieutenant Governors of Georgia (U.S. state)
People from Millen, Georgia
People from Valdosta, Georgia
20th-century American politicians